Irungu is a surname. Notable people with the surname include:

Bernard Ngumba Irungu (born 1976), Kenyan amateur boxer
Joshua Irungu (born 1970), Kenyan politician and community development specialist
Lorna Irungu (1970–2021), Kenyan television presenter

See also
Irungu Kang'ata, Kenyan politician